Narcisse Bambara (born 23 June 1989) is a Burkinabé footballer who plays as a left-back for RC Kadiogo.

External links
 
 

1989 births
Living people
Sportspeople from Ouagadougou
Burkinabé footballers
Association football fullbacks
Burkina Faso international footballers
2015 Africa Cup of Nations players
Étoile Filante de Ouagadougou players
CS Concordia Chiajna players
FC Universitatea Cluj players
FC Zimbru Chișinău players
Liga I players
Moldovan Super Liga players
Burkinabé expatriate footballers
Burkinabé expatriate sportspeople in Romania
Expatriate footballers in Romania
Burkinabé expatriate sportspeople in Moldova
Expatriate footballers in Moldova
21st-century Burkinabé people